Love Language is a concept popularised by Gary Chapman's 1992 book The Five Love Languages.

Love Language may also refer to:

 Love Language (album), a 1984 album by Teddy Pendergrass
 Love Language, a 2015 album by Wouter Kellerman
 "Love Language", a song by Ariana Grande from the 2020 album Positions
 "Love Language", a song by Crooked Colours from the 2020 album Tomorrows
 "Love Language", a song by Queen Naija from the 2022 album Missunderstood
 "Love Language", a song by SZA from the 2022 album SOS

See also
 The Love Language, American indie rock band